Seán O'Mahony's Gaelic Football Club is a Gaelic football club based in Dundalk, County Louth, Ireland.

History
The club was founded in 1938, and was named after the Irish republican Seán O'Mahony (1872–1934).

They won the 2014 Louth Intermediate Football Championship, going on to win the 2014 Leinster Intermediate Club Football Championship. In 2015 they reached the final of the Louth Senior Football Championship for the first time, and won it in 2016, when Seán O'Mahony's advanced to the 2016–17 All-Ireland Senior Club Football Championship, defeating Baltinglass and Newbridge Sarsfields before losing to Rhode in the Leinster semi-final.

Several players are members of the 27 Infantry Battalion, based at nearby Aiken Barracks.

Notable players
David Crawley
John O'Brien

Honours
Louth Senior Football Championship (1): 2016
Louth Intermediate Football Championship (3): 1992, 1998, 2014
Louth Junior Football Championship (3): 1941, 1973, 1982
Leinster Intermediate Club Football Championship (1): 2014
 Senior Football League Division 2 (1): 2005
 Senior Football League Division 2B (1): 2004
 Senior Football League Division 3 (1): 1987
 Paddy Sheelan Shield (1): 2013
 Kevin Mullen Shield (1): 1982
 Junior 2 Championship (1): 1981
 Junior 2B Championship (1): 2002
 Division 5 Junior League (1): 2021
 Division 4C Junior League (1): 2002

References

Gaelic games clubs in County Louth
Gaelic football clubs in County Louth
Sport in Dundalk